Tuscaloosa is a 2019 American drama film directed by Philip Harder and starring Devon Bostick and Natalia Dyer.  It is based on the 1994 novel of the same name by W. Glasgow Phillips.  It is also Harder's directorial debut.

Plot 
Billy Mitchell, a recent college graduate, falls in love with Virginia, a patient at his father's mental institution just after the civil rights movement, in Tuscaloosa, Alabama. Mitchell and his best friend Nigel, who is black, fight against the racist cops and other authorities. Mitchell is torn between helping his slightly crazy girlfriend escape, maintaining a friendship with his childhood friend, and making his successful father proud of him.

Cast
Natalia Dyer as Virginia
Tate Donovan as Doctor
Devon Bostick as Billy
Marchánt Davis as Nigel
Nathan Phillips as Deputy
Bruce Bohme as Papa
YG as Antoine
Paul Cram as Earl
John Murray as Orderly

Production
The film was shot entirely in the state of Minnesota, with a number of scenes taking place at Carleton College and some at and around director Philip Harder's home. Harder first read the novel in the late 1990s and was immediately interested in directing a film adaptation. He approached Pixel Farm, a Minneapolis-based visual effects company that Harder had worked with regularly on music videos and commercials, to create the movie. Production was set to begin around the late 2000s, with a $3.4 million budget and Thora Birch in talks to star. The financial crisis of 2007–2008 set back production and Harder was unable to get the funding necessary for the film.

Patrick Riley, one of the film's producers, was a neighbor of Harder. After getting to know him, he decided to help fund the movie. Most of the film was shot in two weeks in the fall of 2017.

Reception
The film has  rating on Rotten Tomatoes based on  critic reviews.  Brian Shaer of Film Threat gave it an eight out of ten. It has an average score of 3.3/5 on Letterboxd.

References

External links
 

American drama films
Films based on American novels
Films shot in Minnesota
2019 drama films
2010s English-language films
2010s American films